Michal Klesa (born 13 May 1983) is a professional Czech football player, who plays for Czech Second Division team SK Dynamo České Budějovice as a right midfielder.

He joined his current club on 1 July 2011 after a 6-year spell in 1. FK Příbram.

References
 Profile at iDNES.cz
 Guardian Football

Czech footballers
Czech First League players
SK Dynamo České Budějovice players
1983 births
Living people
Association football midfielders
Footballers from Prague